Moshe Ronen is a Toronto lawyer, and a Jewish community leader. Ronen served as vice-president of the World Jewish Congress, national chair of the Canada-Israel Committee, and president of the Canadian Jewish Congress from 1998 to 2001.

Biography
He was educated at the Associated Hebrew School and Community Hebrew Academy of Toronto (CHAT) before obtaining a degree in political science and economics from York University and a law degree from the University of Windsor. In the 1970s he was a Jewish student activist as head of the Jewish Students' Network. In the 1970s and 1980s he was an activist in the Movement to Free Soviet Jewry in support of refusenik political prisoners in the Soviet Union, in particular Anatoly Shcharansky, and to allow emigration of Soviet Jews to Israel.

In 1985, he led an international student protest against US President Ronald Reagan's 1985 visit to a cemetery in Bitburg, Germany that contained Nazi SS graves. In 1996, he was awarded the Jewish National Fund's Jerusalem of Gold Award and, in 1998, was given the Volunteer Service Award by the province of Ontario.

As CJC president, Ronen successfully advocated the recognition of Yom Hashoah by each provincial government in Canada as a means of remembering and educating people about the Holocaust.

References

Jewish Canadian activists
Lawyers in Ontario
Canadian Jewish Congress
Activists from Toronto
Living people
Year of birth missing (living people)